Sprachen & Dolmetscher Institut München (Languages and translators institute) is located in Maxvorstadt, Munich, Bavaria, Germany.

History 
The Sprachen & Dolmetscher Institut München was founded in 1952 in Munich by Paul Otto Schmidt (1899–1970), the former personal translator of Adolf Hitler

References

External links 
 

Universities and colleges in Munich
Universities in Germany
Maxvorstadt